Ramona Reinke is a retired German swimmer who won a silver medal in the 4 × 100 m medley relay at the 1978 World Aquatics Championships and a bronze medal in the 100 m breaststroke at the 1977 European Aquatics Championships. Between 1977 and 1978 she won three national titles in the 100 m and 200 m breaststroke.

References

Living people
German female breaststroke swimmers
German female swimmers
European Aquatics Championships medalists in swimming
World Aquatics Championships medalists in swimming
Year of birth missing (living people)